Lady in Autumn: The Best of The Verve Years is a compilation album by the singer Billie Holiday.

Critical reception
The Rolling Stone Album Guide called the album "a bittersweet triumph."

In 2000, it was voted number 527 in Colin Larkin's All Time Top 1000 Albums.

Track listing

Disc One
"Body and Soul" – 3:25
"Strange Fruit" – 2:57
"Trav'lin' Light" – 3:27
"All of Me" – 2:01
"(There Is) No Greater Love" – 2:37
"I Cover the Waterfront" – 2:52
"These Foolish Things" – 3:34
"Tenderly" – 3:21
"Autumn in New York" – 3:52
"My Man" – 2:37
"Stormy Weather" – 3:39
"Yesterdays" – 2:47
"(I Got a Man, Crazy for Me) He's Funny That Way" – 3:09
"What a Little Moonlight Can Do" – 3:11
"I Cried for You (Now It's Your Turn to Cry Over Me)" – 2:27
"Too Marvelous for Words" – 2:12
"I Wished on the Moon" – 6:44
"I Don't Want to Cry Anymore" – 3:54
"Prelude to a Kiss" – 5:35
"Nice Work If You Can Get It" – 3:50

Disc Two
"Come Rain or Come Shine" – 4:20
"What's New?" – 4:16
"God Bless the Child" – 3:58
"Do Nothin' Till You Hear from Me" – 4:13
"April in Paris" – 3:01
"Lady Sings the Blues" – 2:39
"Don't Explain" – 2:25
"Fine and Mellow [live]" – 3:21
"I Didn't Know What Time It Was" – 5:58
"Stars Fell on Alabama" – 4:27
"One for My Baby (And One More for the Road)" – 5:38
"Gee Baby, Ain't I Good to You" - 5:36
"Lover Man" – 3:08
"All the Way" – 3:22
"Don't Worry 'Bout Me" – 3:09

References 

Billie Holiday albums
1991 greatest hits albums
Verve Records compilation albums